Tongo Island is an island in the Ionian Sea in southern Albania. It is a rocky island, and its waters are rich in aquatic life.

See also
Tourism in Albania
Albanian Riviera
Geography of Albania

References

Uninhabited islands of Albania
Ionian Islands
Islands of Albania
Geography of Vlorë County